Central Mainline Sewer Authority is an agency providing sewage treatment to all of Cassandra and Lilly Boroughs and parts of Cresson, Portage, and Washington Townships.

About the system 
Discussions began back in 1992 between the different municipalities on how to bring public sewerage in the area. It was not until 2002 that the construction of sewer lines, and later the treatment plant began. A dedication ceremony was held on August 21, 2006, by local congressman John Murtha who said "You can breathe and smell fresh air. You don’t smell it anymore in Lilly, the way it used to be." The total costs of the system was $10 million and took 14 years.

References

Water companies of the United States
Water management authorities in the United States
1992 establishments in Pennsylvania
Cambria County, Pennsylvania